Dork Hunters from Outer Space (German: Dork - Jäger aus dem All) is an animated television series produced by the German company BKN International and subsidiary BKN New Media. The series was created by Rick Ungar. It first aired on RTL II in Germany and on GMTV in the United Kingdom.

The show is about a group of five teenagers (two humans and three aliens) who try to stop a group of villains called the Dorks. The kids take their orders from a goldfish named Sidney.

The show received high ratings on GMTV, ranking as the channel's second most-popular show among children aged 4–9 for the year of 2008.

About
The series centres on five teenagers named Mac, Eddie, Nikki, Angie and Romeo. Eddie and Angie are brother and sister who attend a high school in Paramus, New Jersey, while Mac, Nikki, and Romeo are extraterrestrials who landed on earth after taking a wrong turn at Saturn.

Due to their powers, they can detect the nasty smells of "Dorks", aliens with the power to disguise themselves as humans and cause trouble, summoned by a dog-resembling alien named Fido, the loyal pet of Principal Jones.

Characters

Protagonists 
 Eddie (voiced by Eric Meyers), one of the two humans on the Dork Hunters team. He is Angie's twin brother and is very clever. He is 14 years old.
 Angie (voiced by Lili Katz), a human girl and the fashionista of the team who loves clothes and make-up. She is 14 years old.
 Mac (voiced by Alan Marriott), an alien with a long tongue. He is 16 years old.
 Nicki (voiced by Lynn Blade), an alien who can shoot lasers from her fingers. She is 16 years old.
 Romeo (voiced by Ben Small), an alien with a skateboard that can shoot laser beams. He is 16 years old.
 Chief Sidney a talking goldfish who is the leader of the Dork Hunters. He lives in a little aquarium.

Antagonists 
 Fido (voiced by Gary Martin), the Chihuahua-disguised leader of the Dorks who is the show's main antagonist.
 Principal Jones (voiced by Dian Perry), the principal of the High School and the owner of Fido.

Episodes

Season 1

Season 2

Production
The show was first announced under the title Triple Threat from Outer Space in 2005. It was given a budget of US$6.5 million and was scheduled to air by September 2006. At this stage, the concept was slightly different, and it was about three alien girls named Star, Mac, and Nicki posing as humans. For the final show, Star's name was changed to Romeo, Mac was changed to a boy, and human twins Eddie and Angie were added to the team. The series' new title and characters were confirmed in an Animation Magazine article in December 2005.

BKN International, a German studio, produced the show after setting up a subsidiary in London called BKN New Media Ltd. Originally, 26 episodes were planned, but was increased to 36 by February 2007. Jeff "Swampy" Marsh was the director of production. Sean Catherine Derek, known for her work on Batman: The Animated Series, was the co-developer of the show (alongside creator Rick Ungar). Dreamforest Animation in the Philippines handled  the series' animation.

Broadcast
In February 2007, GMTV in the United Kingdom and RTL II in Germany was announced as the initial broadcasters for the series. The series was originally planned to premiere on RTL II first in Late-2007, but instead premiered on March 26, 2008, airing every weekday.

In April 2008, Network Ten in Australia, SABC in South Africa and CTC in Russia had acquired the broadcast rights in their respective countries.

In January 2009, Jetix acquired pay-TV rights for the show in the United Kingdom.

In Spain, the series aired on Clan TVE.

Film
A feature film based on the show, titled Dork Hunters and the Pirates of Tortuga Island, was announced by BKN on May 15, 2008, and was released on DVD in the United States by Image Entertainment on March 9, 2010.

Similar to the Zorro: Generation Z DVD movies, Dork Hunters and the Pirates of Tortuga Island consists of three related episodes (The "Summer Vacation" three-parter) edited in a feature-length format.

Home Media
In Australia, Magna Home Entertainment released two DVDs of the series each containing nine episodes on May 9, 2009, called "The Dorkinator", and "Dorks in Black".

In the United States, Image Entertainment released a three-disc set containing all 36 episodes of the series on February 9, 2010.

Ratings 
The series was the second most popular show on GMTV among children aged 4–9 for the year of 2008. It had an audience share of around 38%. It also ranked as the number two show in terms of share across all children 4–15 years in November 2008.

References 

2008 British television series debuts
2009 British television series endings
2000s British animated television series
British children's animated action television series
Jetix original programming
Television shows set in New Jersey